Rabelais Student Media is the current student newspaper at La Trobe University, Melbourne, Australia, named after French Renaissance writer François Rabelais.

From its founding in 1967, Rabelais Student Media had been run as a department of the La Trobe University Student Representative Council (subsequently by the former La Trobe Student Union). The paper was funded by a combination of advertising revenue and a student levy.  Editors are elected annually and serve for a single year.

Rabelais has a notorious history in the Australian legal world. The July 1995 edition of the magazine published an article which allegedly incited readers to shoplift as a means of surviving student poverty.  This edition was subsequently banned by the Office of Film and Literature Classification and the editors of the magazine charged with publishing, distributing and depositing an objectionable publication. In this instance an objectional publication was defined as one that allegedly incited criminal activity. The editors lodged an appeal, which led to a protracted four-year court case. The appeal was eventually defeated by the full bench of the Federal Court, who refused the editors application to appeal to the High Court of Australia. The criminal charges were dropped in March 1999. On campus, the paper was known for casting a critical eye over the actions of the Union and the University at large.

After many different formats and regime changes over the years, Rabelais was published monthly during the school year (March to November) and has a circulation of approx 9,000. In 2011, the publication has adopted a more informal magazine style, while still keeping the format of a newspaper. There is more content about music, movies, books, student life and fashion. From 2021, Rabelais discontinued publishing physical magazine copies due to funding cuts to the La Trobe Student Union, Rabelais now publishes student content on their website.

Past editors of Rabelais 

1967 - Michel Lawrence
1968 - Michel Lawrence
1969 - Rod Bishop and Keith Robertson
1970 - Grant Evans
1975 - Andrew Stein & Bruce Sims
1976 - Jo Williams (Calluy) & Lazlo Harmathy
1977 - Bill Bowman & Neil McCarthy
1979 - Phillip Bain
1993 - Beverley Jefferson, Sarah Lowe & Anita Langford
1994 - Chris Bamford, Warren Williams, & John Hammerschmidt
1995 - Michael Brown, Melita Berndt, Ben Ross & Valentina Srpcanska
1998 - Sonia Popp
1999 - Carol Peterson, Yael Zalchendler, Rebecca Tripp, James Keck
2000 - Jake Wilson
2001 - Leigh Milward, Brendan Meilak, Claire Leveridge & Nic Townsend
2002 - Steven Brown & Megan McIntyre
2003 - Leigh Milward, Samuel Palmer, Abram DeBruyn, Misha
2004 - Lefa Singleton, Tim Norton & Samuel Palmer
2005 - Lefa Singleton, Tim Norton & Brad Lacey
2006 - Paul D'Agostino
2007 - Nerissa Symon
2008 - Robert Kelly & Dylan Mraz
2009 - Leticia Quintana
2010 - Michael Nolan
2011 - Jessica Fichera
2012 - Darryl Ephraums & Elizabeth King
2013 - Finbar James & Anastasha Boado
2014 - Nikita Vanderbyl & Finbar James
2015 - Rachael Roberts & Sally O'Brien
2016 - Emilia Sterjova & Sarah Gard
2017 - Kevin Kapeke & Zach Steenhuis
2018 - Abood Shehada & Lois Vilar
2019 - Christopher Graham & Sean Carroll
2020 - Christopher Graham & Clodie Veyrac
2021 - Leah Holden & Lewis Kimpton Drake
2022 - Callum Burkitt & Lewis Kimpton Drake

Rebellious 
Rebellious is the Women's Edition of Rabelais. It is edited and published by the Women's Collective under the auspices of the Women's officer. Rebellious has been issued once a year since the early 1970s.

Student media at La Trobe 
Between 1979 and 1995, the Bendigo Student Association produced a newspaper called Third Degree. At the time of the paper's establishment, the Bendigo campus was a College of Advanced Education, from 1994, it was a campus of La Trobe University.  Third Degree was operating in around 2005, but is no longer published.

Rabelais, under threat from the actions of the University, may have to issue their final edition in 2021. Following the forced amalgamation of the regional campuses Student Associations, in an attempt to silence student criticism and reduce funding given back to the student body, Rabelais has suffered serious cuts. In order to continue to operate, on a shoestring budget, Rabelais has transitioned fully online and cut down on their events and offerings.

Notes

See also
 List of college newspapers

External links
Rabelais' website
Rabelais Student Media
La Trobe Uni SRC
Rabelais source documents (Reason in Revolt)

For full details regarding the controversy surrounding Rabelais see archived pages of the Rabelais Defence Committee. This site provides archived links to third party citations including press clippings, media releases and court judgements. 
Rabelais Defence Campaign
  Christopher van Opstal: The art of censorship

Student newspapers published in Australia
Newspapers established in 1967
François Rabelais
1967 establishments in Australia